Oberea atropunctata is a species of flat-faced longhorn beetle in the tribe Saperdini in the genus Oberea, discovered by Pic in 1916.

References

A
Beetles described in 1916